KCNQ (102.5 FM) is a radio station broadcasting a country format. Licensed to Kernville, California, United States, it serves the Lake Isabella, California, area.  The station is owned by Craig and Patricia Lutz, through licensee Alta Sierra Broadcasting LLC, and features programming from ABC Radio.

External links

CNQ
Radio stations established in 1988